The London and South Western Railway L11 class was a class of 4-4-0 steam locomotives designed for mixed traffic work.  They were introduced in 1903 and were nicknamed "Large Hoppers". As with most other Drummond productions, the locomotive had two inside cylinders and Stephenson link valve gear.

Background
The L11 class was one of a number of designs by Dugald Drummond incorporating a large proportion of standard parts that could be interchanged with other classes of locomotive. The boiler was interchangeable with the T9 class, and likewise was equipped with water tubes fitted across the firebox combustion space, with the aim of increasing heating surface whilst facilitating water circulation; this device however also increased maintenance costs and was soon removed by Drummond's successor, Robert Urie.

Later history 
The L11 class was never equipped with a superheater as was applied to other Drummond types.  The class was coupled to a six-wheeled tender as standard, although from time to time they had the Drummond eight-wheeled 'watercart' by way of tender interchange. Eight locomotives were converted to oil firing as part of government trials in 1947 to 1948. 

No examples have been preserved.

Construction table

Livery and numbering

LSWR and Southern

Under the LSWR, the L11s were outshopped in the LSWR Passenger Sage Green livery with purple-brown edging, creating panels of green.  This was further lined in white and black with 'LSWR' in gilt on the tender tank sides.

When transferred to Southern Railway ownership after 1923, the locomotives were outshopped in Richard Maunsell's darker version of the LSWR livery. The LSWR standard gilt lettering was changed to yellow with 'Southern' on the water tank sides.  The locomotives also featured black and white lining.

Post-1948 (nationalisation) 

Livery after Nationalisation was initially Southern freight livery with 'British Railways' on the tender, and an 'S' prefix on the number.  The class was subsequently outshopped in BR Mixed Traffic Black with red and white lining, with the BR crest on the tender.

Locomotive numbering was per BR standard practice, with 40 locomotives passing into British Railways ownership in 1948 and they were numbered randomly (with other LSWR classes) in the ranges 30134-30175, 30405-30414, 30435-30442. Numbering was based upon the batches built. However, thirteen of the locomotives had been withdrawn by the end of 1948, resulting in gaps in the sequence.

Comparison with K10
According to Dendy Marshall, the main differences between the K10 "Small Hoppers" and the L11 "Large Hoppers" were:
 K10, 9 foot coupling rods and C8 type boiler
 L11, 10 foot coupling rods and T9 type boiler

References

External links 

 SEMG gallery

L11
4-4-0 locomotives
Railway locomotives introduced in 1903
Scrapped locomotives
Standard gauge steam locomotives of Great Britain